World Education Services (WES) is a nonprofit organization that provides credential evaluations for international students and immigrants planning to study or work in the U.S. and Canada. Founded in 1974, it is based in New York, U.S. It also has operations in Toronto, Canada.

WES evaluates more than 200,000 credentials per year; they auto-authenticate and define foreign education in U.S. or Canadian terms. WES reports that its credential evaluations are nonbinding advisory opinions.

WES's proprietary database collects and stores information of academic certificates of more than 200 countries, 45,000 foreign institutions, and 20,000 academic credentials. However, WES does not have formal agreements with educational systems of any country, and the kept certificates are voluntarily provided by the candidates, and they operate with third-party motives.

WES is accredited by and is a charter member of the National Association of Credential Evaluation Services (NACES) and the Alliance of Credential Evaluation Services of Canada (ACESC). The U.S. Department of Education's website lists NACES and AICE with a disclaimer that the listing of these organizations is not an endorsement.

References

Educational organizations based in the United States
Academic transfer
Education reform
Student assessment and evaluation
Educational evaluation methods